Phidippus octopunctatus is a jumping spider that occurs in the United States and Mexico, mostly in the Great Basin Desert. It is among the largest jumping spiders found in North America, approaching  in body length. They are gray to brownish-gray in color.

Unlike Phidippus californicus, which lives in the same habitat, it builds a large and prominent nest among the branches of a bush to house its egg cocoon.

Adult males, unmated adult and subadult females can be found in late August.

Phidippus octopunctatus has been observed to hunt large prey, such as grasshoppers and bees.

Footnotes

References
 (1883): Descriptions of new or little known spiders of the family Attidae from various parts of the United States of North America. Milwaukee, 1-35.
 (1965): Observations on Three Species of Phidippus Jumping Spiders (Araneae: Salticidae). Psyche 72: 133-147. PDF (P. californicus = P. coccineus, P. apacheanus, P. octopunctatus = P. opifex)
 (2004): Revision of the jumping spiders of the genus Phidippus (Araneae: Salticidae). Occas. Pap. Florida State Collect. Arthropods 11: 1-156.

External links

Pictures of P. octopunctatus
Diagnostic drawings of P. octopunctatus
Pictures at BugGuide.net

Salticidae
Spiders of Mexico
Spiders of the United States
Spiders described in 1883